Wonderful Losers: A Different World is a 2017 Lithuanian documentary film directed by Arūnas Matelis about the Giro d'Italia. It was selected as the Lithuanian entry for the Best Foreign Language Film at the 91st Academy Awards, but it was not nominated.

Synopsis
The film profiles the unsung heroes of medics and water carriers working in the world of competitive cycling.

See also
 List of submissions to the 91st Academy Awards for Best Foreign Language Film
 List of Lithuanian submissions for the Academy Award for Best Foreign Language Film

References

External links
 

2017 films
2017 documentary films
Lithuanian documentary films
2010s Italian-language films
Giro d'Italia
Documentary films about cycling
Films shot in Italy
Films set in Italy